7, sometimes called Seven, is the seventh album by artist David Meece. Five of the nine tracks charted on Christian radio in 1985 and 1986.

Track listing 

All songs written by David Meece, except where noted.

"You Can Go" (Meece, Michael Card, Mike Hudson) – 3:13
"Tumblin' Down" – 3:33
"Forgiven" – 4:08 
"The Ladder" (Meece, Hudson) – 3:44
"The Alien" (Keith Thomas, Meece) – 4:33
"We Can Overcome It All" – 3:32
"The Unknown Soldier" with Twila Paris (Meece, Morgan Cryar, Jonathan David Brown) – 4:43
"Lean On Each Other" – 3:49
"I Can See" (Meece, Gloria Gaither) – 5:34

Personnel 

 David Meece – lead vocals, backing vocals (1, 2, 7), acoustic piano (9)
 Robbie Buchanan – synthesizers (1, 2), acoustic piano (3)
 Shane Keister – acoustic piano (1), Fairlight piano (1), acoustic guitar (1), Yamaha GS1 (2), sound effects (2), vocoder (2, 3), keyboards (8)
 Rhett Lawrence – synthesizers (3), sound effects (3), additional programming (7)
 Keith Thomas – keyboards (4, 5), arrangements (4, 5), backing vocals (5)
 John Andrew Schreiner – keyboards (6), LinnDrum programming (6), arrangements (6)
 Carl Marsh – Fairlight programming (7)
 Dann Huff – rhythm guitar (2), guitar solo (2), electric guitar (3), guitars (4, 5)
 Michael Thompson – guitars (6)
 Marty Walsh – electric guitar (7)
 Jon Goin – guitars (8)
 Mike Brignardello – bass (1, 2, 3, 8)
 Nathan East – bass (4, 5) 
 Paul Leim – drums (1, 2, 3), drum programming (1)
 Carlos Vega – drums (4, 5)
 Lee Kix – drums (6)
 Mark Hammond – drums (8)
 Lenny Castro – percussion (1, 2)
 Farrell Morris – percussion (8)
 Mark Douthit – saxophone (5)
 Alan Moore – orchestration (9)
 Greg Nelson – conductor (9)
 Eberhard Ramm – musical score preparation (9)
 The Nashville String Machine – strings (9)
 Chris Harris – backing vocals (1, 2)
 Gary Pigg – backing vocals (1, 2)
 Allen Green – backing vocals (4, 5)
 Greg Guidry – backing vocals (4, 5)
 Denny Henson – backing vocals (4, 5)
 Dana Hiett – backing vocals (6)
 Biff Vincent – backing vocals (6)
 Twila Paris – lead and backing vocals (7)
 Jonathan David Brown – backing vocals (7), arrangements (7)
 First Call – backing vocals (8)
 Bonnie Keen
 Marty McCall
 Melodie Tunney

Production

 Brown Bannister – producer (1–3)
 Keith Thomas – producer (4–5)
 Skip Konte – producer, engineer (6)
 Jonathan David Brown – producer, engineer (7)
 David Meece – producer (8, 9)
 Greg Nelson – producer (8, 9)
 Michael Blanton – executive producer (1–3)
 Dan Harrell – executive producer (1–3)
 Lynn Nichols – executive producer (4–9)
 Bubba Smith – production coordinator and consultant (1, 2, 3, 6, 7)
 Jeff Balding – production assistant, engineer (4, 5)
 Lori Loving – production assistant (4, 5)
 Gloria Cox – production manager (8, 9)
 Jack Joseph Puig – engineer (1–3)
 Ed Seay – engineer (8, 9)
 Steve Ford – assistant engineer (1–3)
 Dan Garcia – assistant engineer (1–3)
 Allan Henry – assistant engineer (1–3)
 Bob Lockhart – assistant engineer (7)
 Terry Lang – assistant engineer (7)
 Tom Van Etten – assistant engineer (7)
 Tom Harding – assistant engineer (8, 9)
 Joe Bogan – additional engineer (4, 5)
 Gene Eichelberger – additional engineer (4, 5)
 Bill Schnee Studios, North Hollywood, California – recording location
 Mama Jo's Recording Studio, North Hollywood, California – recording location
 Weddington Studio, North Hollywood, California – recording location
 Rumbo Recorders, Los Angeles, California – recording location
 Front Page Recording, Glendale, California – recording location
 Bullet Recording, Nashville, Tennessee – recording location
 Ocean Way, Nashville, Tennessee – recording location
 Emerald Sound Studios, Nashville, Tennessee – recording location
 Hummingbird Studio, Nashville, Tennessee – recording location
 Gold Mine Studio, Nashville, Tennessee – recording location
 Treasure Isle Recorders, Nashville, Tennessee – recording location
 Jeff Balding – mixing at MasterMix, Nashville, Tennessee
 Steve Hall – mastering at Future Disc, Hollywood, California
 Buddy Jackson – art direction, design, at Jackson Design
 Mark Tucker – photography

Charts

Album

Singles
"You Can Go" – No. 1 for five weeks in 1985
"Forgiven" – No. 8 in 1985
"We Can Overcome It All" – No. 10 in 1986
"The Unknown Soldier"  with Twila Paris – No. 8 in 1986
"The Alien" – No. 15 in 1986

References 

David Meece albums
1985 albums